Scott Stokdyk (born October 16, 1969) is an American visual effects artist who is best known for his work on the films Spider-Man and Spider-Man 2.

Oscar history

Stokdyk has won the Academy Award for Best Visual Effects once, with a further two nominations. All of the following are in this category: 

73rd Academy Awards-Nominated for Hollow Man, nomination shared with  Scott E. Anderson, Craig Hayes and Stan Parks. Lost to Gladiator.
75th Academy Awards-Nominated for Spider-Man. Nomination shared with John Dykstra, John Frazier and Anthony LaMolinara. Lost to The Lord of the Rings: The Two Towers.
77th Academy Awards-Spider-Man 2, award shared with John Dykstra, John Frazier and Anthony LaMolinara. Won.

Selected filmography

 Broken Arrow (1996)
 The Fifth Element (1997)
 Titanic (1997)
 Godzilla (1998)
 Hollow Man (2000)
 Spider-Man (2002)
 Spider-Man 2 (2004)
 Spider-Man 3 (2007)
 G-Force (2009)
 Oz the Great and Powerful (2013)

References

External links

Living people
1969 births
Best Visual Effects Academy Award winners
Special effects people